Heppner Junior/Senior High School is a public high school in Heppner, Oregon, United States.

Academics
In 2008, 93% of the school's seniors received a high school diploma. Of 46 students, 43 graduated, one dropped out, and two were still in high school the following year.

Athletics
The Heppner High School football team entered the 2011 season having won 84 consecutive league games, an Oregon state record for all divisions. Their last loss was in 1998.

References

High schools in Morrow County, Oregon
Public middle schools in Oregon
Education in Morrow County, Oregon
Heppner, Oregon
Public high schools in Oregon